Boana palaestes is a species of frog in the family Hylidae that is endemic to Peru. Its natural habitats are subtropical or tropical moist montane forests and rivers.

Sources

Boana
Amphibians of Peru
Amphibians described in 1997
Taxonomy articles created by Polbot